The Buffyverse role-playing games - the Buffy the Vampire Slayer and Angel role-playing games - are complementary, officially licensed role-playing games (RPGs) published by Eden Studios, Inc. The Buffy the Vampire Slayer Core Rulebook was published in 2002, while the Angel Corebook followed in 2003. Both games use a streamlined (or Cinematic) version of Eden Studios' popular Unisystem game engine, also featured in CJ Carella's WitchCraft and All Flesh Must Be Eaten, two of Eden's better-known original product lines. In both games, players are able to take on the roles of characters from the respective television series or create wholly original characters as they and their group see fit, effectively building their own Buffyverse series in the process.

Both games have been hailed for their sleek, accessible ruleset and their "Drama Points" system, which gives players a greater degree of control over the flow of the story, allowing them to call upon heroic bursts of energy, plot twists, and other convenient developments as necessary. The Angel role-playing game won the Origins Award for Best Roleplaying Game in its year of release. Following the success of the games, Eden Studios went on to release other successful licensed products based on the Cinematic Unisystem engine, including a 2005 game Army of Darkness Roleplaying Game, based on the cult film Army of Darkness.

In October 2006, Eden Studios announced that, following settlement of their accounts with Fox and license negotiations, they will cease producing new Buffy the Vampire Slayer or Angel game books or supplements. Support will continue in online forums and web sites.

Adventures
The first published adventure (outside those featured as extras within the main books) specifically created for the Buffy the Vampire Slayer role-playing game was The Dark Druid by Timothy S. Brannan.  The adventure features Fionn mac Cumhaill as a protagonist and ally. His battle with the druid Fer Doirich continues into the modern age, where the adventure posits that the witches Willow and Tara are the reincarnations of his fosterers Bodhmall and Liath respectively.

Game mechanics

Character creation
The Buffy and Angel RPGs utilize a point-based character creation system, in which each player character receives a set number of points in different categories which can then be spent on Attributes, Skills, and Qualities. Drawbacks may also be purchased to provide additional character points, up to an overall limit of ten points. The number of points available to any given character depends on the Character Type (see below).

Stats and tests
The games utilize a variation upon the traditional (or Classic) Unisystem presented in WitchCraft and All Flesh Must Be Eaten. Commonly known as the Cinematic Unisystem, this variant still relies upon the core mechanic common to all of the system's games, in which the outcome of most actions taken by a player character is determined by the following formula Attribute + Skill + X, where X represents a random result on a ten-sided die.

Attributes represent the character's main six abilities, which in this case are three physical attributes (Strength, Dexterity, and Constitution) and three mental attributes (Intelligence, Perception, and Willpower). Willpower represents a change from some Classic Unisystem games, and is used for spellcasting rolls as well as other mental or psychic tasks

There are seventeen basic skills, many of which have irreverent or humorous names, reflecting the style of Whedon's Buffyverse; for example, Getting Medieval (for armed melee combat), Gun Fu (for firearms), and Mr. Fix-It (for repair and mechanical work). This base skill set can be expanded through the use of "Wild Card" skills, which allow a player to establish certain specialties, talents or areas of expertise for their character that might not be covered adequately by the existing rules.

Some Qualities and Drawbacks can also have an impact upon some tests. For example, the Attractiveness Quality/Drawback applies to a variety of social interactions, while some of the package Qualities (such as Slayer, Jock, Artist, etc.) offer assorted bonuses or penalties to rolls under specific circumstances.

Character Types

Buffy
There are three Character Types in the Buffy RPG, though the first two are generally considered most appropriate for most games.

The most inherently low-powered Type is the White Hat, a supportive figure similar to Xander Harris or Willow Rosenberg at the beginning of the series. These characters must frequently focus on specific talents and skills, such as Willow's intelligence and interest in computers, in order to truly excel in any one area. They must also often exercise great care in combat. To make up for their relative weakness, White Hats receive additional Drama Points at the outset, and can use experience points to buy Drama Points at a 1:1 ratio, while Heroes and Experienced Heroes must spend two experience points for each Drama Point. Thus, a White Hat can afford to spend their Drama Points more freely, increasing their chances of survival. According to the rules, however, White Hats lose their 'discount' on Drama Points once they've gained a certain amount of power and expertise.

The Hero Character Type represents such figures as Buffy herself, Spike, or Riley Finn. These are characters with more existing talent (whether this came naturally or through years of training), more experience, and stronger supernatural abilities, if any. As such, they receive a larger number of points to spend on their Attributes, Skills and Qualities. However, their maximum number of Drama Points is only half the store available to a White Hat, and they must replenish Drama Points at a higher cost.

Finally, the Experienced Hero Character Type, representing Buffy, Faith, or other major characters toward the end of the series, describes a powerful, skilled character who's already seen a lot of action and learned from it all. The Experienced Hero receives expanded Attribute and Quality Points, and a broadly expanded pool of Skill Points.

Angel
The Angel RPG features three Character Types which are largely comparable to their counterparts in the Buffy game: the Investigator, Champion, and Veteran. However, to better reflect the fact that characters on Angel tend to be more experienced than characters on Buffy, all of the Character Types receive additional Skill Points (ten points each extra, except Veterans who only receive five points extra) and other upgrades to put them on par with the cast of the series.

Character rewards and development
As in many other RPGs, characters can learn and develop by gaining and expending experience points. These are awarded by the Director, who will usually offer a certain number to all characters for the successful completion of an adventure, and may offer additional experience for particularly good role-playing, particularly when the character is forced to confront their emotional issues (which are usually at least partly defined by their Drawbacks), faces unpleasant news or unwelcome developments, or builds upon friendships or romantic relationships.

An additional reward may be found in the form of Drama Points; though players may spend experience points to give their characters additional Drama Points, these may also be awarded directly by the director in recognition of excellent roleplaying or in consolation for a difficult or tragic event which may deeply impact the character in question.

Canon
The Buffy RPG has already contributed to Buffyverse canon, in that Faith Lehane and Kendra Young's last names were provided by Joss Whedon in response to queries from Eden Studios. These names are now used widely throughout fiction based upon the series.

References

External links

Official website of the Buffy RPG.
 Official website of the Angel RPG.
RPGnet review of the Angel RPG, including a breakdown of chapters.

Buffyverse
Contemporary role-playing games
Eden Studios games
Horror role-playing games
Origins Award winners
Role-playing games based on television series